The 2019–20 season was River Plate's 9th consecutive season in the top division of Argentine football. In addition to the Primera División, the club competed in the Copa Argentina, Copa de la Superliga and Copa Libertadores.

The season covers the period from 1 July 2019 to 30 June 2020.

Review

Pre-season
Zacarías Morán agreed a loan move to Chacarita Juniors on 18 June 2019. Maximiliano Velazco's loan with Defensores de Belgrano, which was set to expire on 30 June, was extended on 20 June. Camilo Mayada headed to Mexico with Atlético San Luis on 22 June. River Plate toured the United States for pre-season, with the first match being played on 27 June against Ventura County Fusion at the Wallis Annenberg Stadium in Los Angeles as they ran out 5–0 winners; with Lucas Beltrán netting twice. On that same day, Héctor Martínez departed on loan to Defensa y Justicia. Their second friendly took place on 28 June, as they scored five again after defeating Guadalajara of Liga MX in game one of the Colossus Cup. 29 June saw Alexander Barboza go to Independiente.

Numerous loans from the previous campaign officially expired on and around 30 June. River met Ventura County Fushion of USL League Two for a secondary match-up on 4 July, with Jorge Carrascal scoring four times in a 7–0 victory. Luciano Lollo was loaned to Banfield on 6 July. On matchday two of the Colossus Cup, River beat another Mexican team in América with goals from Julián Álvarez and Cristian Ferreira.

July
Gimnasia y Esgrima (M) were defeated in the Copa Argentina R32 on 16 July, though it took a 4–5 penalty shoot-out win to do so. Carlos Auzqui went off on loan to Lanús on 17 July. On 23 July, River Plate met Brazilian club Cruzeiro in the first leg of a Copa Libertadores round of sixteen encounter, as the two played out a goalless draw at the Estadio Monumental Antonio Vespucio Liberti. River travelled to Argentinos Juniors in game one of the 2019–20 Primera División, subsequently coming away with a point. On 30 July, after they again drew 0–0 with Cruzeiro in the Copa Libertadores, River Plate advanced to the next round following a 2–4 penalty shoot-out.

August
On 1 August, Joaquín Arzura headed out on loan to Huracán. Hours later, River announced their first signing of the new campaign as Paulo Díaz arrived from Al-Ahli of the Saudi Professional League. River built upon their point on the opening day in the Primera División over Argentinos Juniors with a 3–0 win versus Lanús on 4 August on home soil. Alan Marcel Picazzo joined Villa Dálmine on loan on 8 August. River beat All Boys 7–0 and 5–1 in friendlies on 9 August, with Matías Suárez netting a hat-trick in the former while Ignacio Scocco scored a brace in the latter. 10 August saw Santiago Vera leave River Plate, as the midfielder agreed terms on a move to Paraguayan Primera División outfit Olimpia. Colo-Colo revealed the loan signing of Iván Rossi on 13 August.

River, for the first time since 1962, put six goals past reigning champions Racing Club away from home in the league on 17 August. River Plate defeated Cerro Porteño in the first leg of a Copa Libertadores quarter-final on 22 August, winning 2–0 after Ignacio Fernández and Rafael Santos Borré netted spot-kicks. River's first league loss came three days later, as Talleres won at the Estadio Monumental Antonio Vespucio Liberti for the first time in twenty-nine years. On 29 August, River progressed to the Copa Libertadores semi-finals after beating Paraguayan side Cerro Porteño 3–1 on aggregate, having drawn 1–1 in the second leg in Asunción.

September
River opened September with a Superclásico at home to Boca Juniors, which ended drawn after no goals were scored.

Squad

Transfers
Domestic transfer windows:3 July 2019 to 24 September 201920 January 2020 to 19 February 2020.

Transfers in

Transfers out

Loans out

Friendlies

Pre-season
In June 2019, River Plate were announced as one of four clubs, alongside Guadalajara, América and Boca Juniors, that would take part in the inaugural Colossus Cup in the United States. They were scheduled to face the Liga MX duo at the SDCCU Stadium in San Diego on 28 June and at CenturyLink Field in Seattle on 6 July. A day before facing Guadalajara, the club took on USL League Two side Ventura County Fusion in a friendly match. They met the American outfit again on 4 July.

Mid-season
River Plate and All Boys (Primera B Nacional) scheduled a friendly with each other for 9 August, in Ezeiza at River Camp.

Competitions

Primera División

League table

Relegation table

Source: AFA

Results summary

Matches
The fixtures for the 2019–20 campaign were released on 10 July.

Copa Argentina

River Plate would meet Primera B Nacional side Gimnasia y Esgrima (M) on 16 July 2019, a match that would take place at the Estadio Único in Villa Mercedes.

Copa de la Superliga

Copa Libertadores

River Plate were drawn with Brazil's Cruzeiro in the Copa Libertadores round of sixteen in May 2019, with the ties set for the succeeding July. Their subsequent win meant they'd play Cerro Porteño, fresh from knocking out San Lorenzo, in the quarter-finals. Local rivals Boca Juniors would await in the semi-finals, in what was a rematch of the 2018 finals.

Squad statistics

Appearances and goals

Statistics accurate as of 2 September 2019.

Goalscorers

Notes

References

Club Atlético River Plate seasons
River Plate